Guillaume Leblon (born 1971 in Lille) is a French sculptor and visual artist. He lives and works in New York City.

Life and career 

Guillaume Leblon studied at the École nationale supérieure des beaux-arts de Lyon, France, from which he received his diploma in 1997. He continued his career through numerous residencies, including at the Rijksakademie van beeldende kunsten in Amsterdam, the Netherlands (1999–2000) and at the International Studio & Curatorial Program (ISCP) in New York in 2008. Leblon participated in the Sonsbeek exhibition in Arnhem, the Netherlands, in the 2001 edition that was curated by Jan Hoet. In 2011, he was nominated for the Marcel Duchamp Prize.

Artistic work 

Guillaume Leblon’s artistic practice is built on a number of integrative processes, incorporating elements of sculpture, performance, sound and film in heterogenous installations of dynamic reflection. Guillaume Leblon’s oeuvre is characterized by the association of physical and sentimental phenomena, exploring the intersection of imposing constructions and the fluidity of their individual elements, paying particular attention to all of the senses. Rejecting the clear definitions of conceptualism in his work, Leblon emphasizes the individual pathos contained in his constructions, engaging not only the physical elements but also motions that they encourage. Finding some influence in the construction and transmission of intimate interactions encouraged by arte povera artists, his work has previously been compared to that of Franz West or Thomas Schütte.

Often producing monumental works that actively interact with the spaces in which they are exhibited, Leblon’s pieces build on their surroundings as they intersect and reconfigure their environment. A number of Leblon’s pieces take this approach, like Raum (2006), a massive white cube constructed from plaster walls that intrudes on the gallery in which it is exposed and effectively directs the movement of the visitor. The piece National Monument (2006–2014) is another excellent example of this practice – a tremendous gray cube of fresh clay held together with sections of white fabric reminiscent of bandages, the installation is placed straddling two rooms of an exhibition space. Bisecting and simultaneously redefining the spaces of galleries and museums in which the installation is shown, such pieces confront two- and three-dimensional vectors in temporal and spatial capacities, inhabiting and redefining their surroundings. The imposing installation engages the viewer not only through controlling their movements, but also by captivating all of the senses. Kept malleable by a steady stream of water pouring over the clay, the act that interjects a fluidity and life to a seemingly solid construction also fills the exhibition space with a characteristic smell that engages the senses of the viewer. A similar imposition in the spaces of exhibition can be found in the piece Faces contre terre (2010), in which in various elements of discarded furniture cover the floor of the room in which they are placed. Arranged in a non-hierarchical manner, blocking the way and forcing the viewer to actively interact with the work through walking on it. (in focus) The combination of striking, the imposition of shapes through manipulating the exhibition and guiding the viewer is therefore central to his practice.

Since 2009, Leblon has been engaging with sculptures assembled from assorted elements heterogenous in provenance and time, creating structures that unite external elements in one time and space within the artist’s atelier. The shifting and detached nature of Leblon’s work is visualized through this mise-en-scene, creating tensions between the different states of the elements of his pieces. Working at times with 16mm film, Leblon follows movemenet that crosses architectural and natural spaces, invading their environments through active interjection. The looped film Villa Cavrois (2000) is an example of this practice, exploring a decaying villa together with the viewer, revealing and concealing rooms and locations in an unexpected journey. Similarly, Leblon explores the relationship between the artist, the viewer and the landscape they inhabit in Temps Libre (2001), a film showing him jumping from a third-story building into the abyss below during the Sonbeek exhibition in Arnhem in 2001.

Exhibitions

Selected solo exhibitions 
 2022-23: PARADE, Palais de Tokyo, Paris, France
 2022-23: PATAQUÉS, Nathalie Obadia Gallery, Paris, France
 2022: The Traveler Walking on a tiptoe, Nathalie Obadia Gallery, Brussels, Belgium
 2019: AMERICA, Projecte SD Gallery, Barcelona, Spain
 2019: AEROSOL, LABOR Gallery, Mexico City, Mexico
 2018: Still Wave, Gallery Carlier Gebauer, Berlin, Germany
 2018: Guillaume Leblon | There is a man, and more, S.M.A.K., Gent, Belgium 
 2017: PATAQUÉS, Galeria Travesia Cuatro, Guadalajara, Mexico 
 2017: " (...) "youporn", "zbooby", "zerogras", "zÄzette" (…) ", Galerie Jocelyn Wolff, Paris, France 
 2016: THERE IS A MAN, Gallery Carlier Gebauer, Berlin, Germany
 2016: UNTANGLED FIGURES, Contemporary Art Gallery, Vancouver, Canada 
 2015: Le pods que la main supporte, Panorama, Friche Belle de Mai, Marseille, France 
 2014: À dos de cheval avec le peintre, IAC – Institut d’Art Contemporain, Villeurbanne, Lyon, France
 2013: backstroke, carlier | gebauer, Berlin, Germany
 2013: Under my shoe, MassMoca, North Adams, USA 
 2012: Une appropriation de la nature, Musée de Sérignan, Sérignan, France 
 2008: Wenn ein resiender in einer Winternacht, MARTa Herford, Herford, Germany
 2008: Martian Museum of Terrestrial Art, Barbican Centre, London, UK 
 2008: Guillaume Leblon: Four Ladders, STUK Arts Centre, Leuven, Belgium
 2008: A Town (Not a City), Kunsthalle St. Gallen, St. Gallen, Switzerland
 2007: Mimetic, Centre d’art de l’Yonne, Auxerre, France 
 2007: The Re-Conquest of Space, OVERGADEN, Copenhagen, Denmark 
 2007: De leur temps, Musée de Grenoble, Grenoble, France 
 2006: Guillaume Leblon, Kunstverein Düsseldorf, Düsseldorf, Germany
 2005: Le Génie du lieu, FRAC Bourgogne, Dijon, France 
 2003/2004: PORTAL 2, Kunsthalle Fridericianum, Kassel, Germany

Selected group exhibitions 
 2020: Des Mondes construits, MNAM, Center Pompidou-Metz, France 
 2019: The house where your live for ever, Garage Rotterdam, The Netherlands 
 2018: Or: Un voyage dans l’histoire de l’art au fil de l’or, MUCEM, Marseille, France 
 2018: Front International Cleveland Triennial for Contemporary Art, Cleveland, USA 
 2017: Singin Stones, Palais de Tokyo hors les murs, Roundhouse, DuSable Museum of African American History, Chicago, USA 
 2017: Paleolithic to Contemporary, Icons and Tools, Jean-David Cahn Gallery, Basel, Switzerland 
 2016: La French Touch, Artspace Boan, Seoul, South Korea
 2016: ON SITE, FIAC, Petit Palais, Paris France 
 2016: Poésie balistique, La Verrière, FOndation d’entreprise Hermès, Brussels, Belgium 
 2016: Accrochage, a selection from the Pinault Collection, Punta della Dogana, Venice, Italy 
 2016: Collections: Elémentaires, Les Abattoirs, Toulouse, France 
 2015: Villa Toronto, Toronto, Canada
 2015: L’usage des forms, artisans d’art et artistes, Palais de Tokyo, Paris, France
 2014–2016: Une Histoire (art archi design/des années 80 à nos jours), Centre Pompidou, Paris, France 
 2014: La nature et ses proportions, Galerie Jocelyn Wolff, Paris France 
 2013: Une preface, Le Plateau, FRAC Ile de France, Paris, France 
 2013: Je jouais avec les chiens et je voyais le ciel et le voyais l’air, Les Pléiades, 30 ans de FRAC, Toulouse, France
 2013: Map, record, picture, sculpture, Projecte SD, Barcelona, Spain
 2013: 1966–79, IAC, Villeurbane, France, curator: Laurent-Montaron 
 2013: Die Wahrscheinlichkeit, dass nichts passiert, Carlier Gebauer, Berlin, Germany 
 2013: L’instinct oublié, Galerie Jocelyn Wolff exhibits at gallery Labor, Mexico City, Mexico 
 2012–2013: Rhona Hofman Gallery, Chicago, USA 
 2012: Biennale de Rennes, Rennes, France 
 2012: Autres, être sauvage de Rousseau à nas jours, Musée-château Annecy, France
 2012: La part de l’autre, Les moulins de Paillard, Poncé-sur-le Loir, France
 2012: Aire de Lyon, Proa Fondation, Buenos Aires, Argentina, curator: Victoria Noorthoorn 
 2012: Alchemy, Fondacio Joan Miró, Barcelona, Spain

Projects 
 2013: Monument aux morts, Saint-Martin-Cantalès (15), Auvergne, France
 2013: Collection Daniel Cordier, carte blanche à Guillaume Leblon, Les Abattoirs, Toulouse, France
 2008: Curating the Library, De Singel, Antwerp, Belgium. Curator: Moritz Kung. 
 2006–2014: L’Entretien, theater play, written by Thomas Boutoux & Guillaume Leblon, based on a fictive conversation between an artist and a curator. 
 2004: Le Teaser, visual storyline for one of the sixth edition of Le Teaser, with texts by Tom Gidley, Phyllis Kiehl, Simon Takahashi, Tom McCarthy, Metronom Press, Paris

Screenings 
 2018: Notes, FRAC Bretagne Rennes, France – Notes 
 2007: Villa Cavrois, Tobias Putrih exhibition, Slovenian Pavilion, 52nd Venice Biennial, San Servolo Island, Italy, curator: Francesco Manacorda
 2002: Villa Cavrois, Polyphonix Film Festival, MNAM, Centre Georges Pompidou, Paris, France

References 

Living people
1971 births
21st-century French sculptors
21st-century French male artists
French contemporary artists